The Akritas plan, was an inside document of the Greek Cypriot secret organisation of EOK (mostly known as Akritas organisation) that was authored in 1963 and was revealed to the public in 1966. It entailed the weakening the Turkish Cypriots in the government of Cyprus and then uniting (enosis) Cyprus with Greece. According to Turkish Cypriots, the plan was a "blueprint to genocide", but Greek Cypriots claimed that it was rather a “defensive plan”.

Background
Cyprus, an island lying in the eastern Mediterranean sea was ruled by several conquerors during its history. In the late 19th century, the Ottoman Empire handed Cyprus to the British Empire. Greek and Turkish nationalism among the two major communities of the island (four-fifths of the population being Greek, one-fifth Turkish) were growing, seeking opposite goals. Greeks were demanding enosis (Cyprus to be united with Greece) while Turks were aiming for taksim (partition). In 1955, EOKA, a paramilitary guerilla group, declared its struggle against the British.

In 1960, the British gave in and turned power over to the Greek and Turkish Cypriots. A powersharing constitution was created for the new Republic of Cyprus and included both Turkish and Greek Cypriots holding power. Three treaties were written up to guarantee the integrity and security of the new republic: the Treaty of Establishment, the Treaty of Guarantee and the Treaty of Alliance. According to the constitution, Cyprus was to become an independent republic with a Greek Cypriot president and a Turkish Cypriot vice-president, with full powersharing between Turkish and Greek Cypriots.

Akritas organisation and plan 
Akritas organisation (or EOK) was a secret group led by prominent members of the Greek Cypriot community, some of them being cabinet ministers. It was formed in 1961 or 1962, in the eve of the creation of Cyprus Republic, and aimed to achieve enosis. It was formed on the command of President Archbishop Makarios, with Glafkos Klerides, Tassos Papadopoulos and Polycarpos Georgadjis having key roles. Guerillas were recruited by former members of EOKA. Apart from communists, who were excluded as in the EOKA's struggle, the organisation had hostile feelings for Greek Cypriots who failed to accept Makarios as their leader, which included ultranationalists who rejected the London-Zürich Agreements. EOK had striking similarities with EOKA, from the structure and the division to tomeis, and its name was also coined to resemble that of EOKA. A joint military exercise was performed in presidential resident in Troodos mountain, along with Greek ELDYK in 1962, other military exercises of smaller-scale also took place in 1962 and 1963.

The plan was an inner document that was publicly revealed in 1966 by pro-Grivas Greek Cypriot newspaper Patris as a response to criticism by pro-Makarios media. It provided a pathway on how to change the constitution of the Cyprus Republic unilaterally, without Turkish Cypriot consent, and to declare enosis with Greece. Because it was expected that Turkish Cypriot would object and revolt, a paramilitary group of several thousand men was formed and began its training. According to the copy of the plan, it consisted of two main sections, one delineating external tactics and the other delineating internal tactics. The external tactics pointed to the Treaty of Guarantee as the first objective of an attack, with the statement that it was no longer recognised by Greek Cypriots. If the Treaty of Guarantee was abolished, there would be no legal roadblocks to enosis, which would happen through a plebiscite.

It is unknown who authored the plan or to what extent Makarios was committed to it. Frank Hoffmeister cited the historian Tzermias to support the notion that Makarios had nothing to do with the plan, but Hoffmeister mentioned John Reddaway and Etrekun, claiming that Makarios had approved the plan.  The plan is signed by "Chief Akritas" (Αρχηγός Ακρίτας). According to Hoffmeister, the plan was drawn by the minister of the interior, Polycarpos Georgadjis. Angelos Chrysostomou, in his PhD thesis, wrote that Glafkos Klerides and Christodoulos Christodoulou, a top member of Akritas organisation, pointed to Tassos Papadopoulos as the author of the document. There is also controversy about when the document was formulated, but the most probable was late 1963.

1963 events in Cyprus 
In November 1963, Greek Cypriot leader Makarios proposed thirteen amendments to change the constitution. The proposals resemble the first part of the Akritas plan.

Bloody Christmas violence led to the deaths of 364 Turkish Cypriots and 174 Greek Cypriots. Akritas organization's forces took part in the fighting. About a quarter of the Turkish Cypriots, some 25,000 or so, fled their homes and lands and moved into enclaves.

Controversy and opinions 
Greek Cypriot sources have accepted the authenticity of the Akritas plan, but controversy regarding its significance and implications persists. It is a subject of debate whether the plan was actually implemented by Makarios. Frank Hoffmeister wrote that the similarity of the military and political actions foreseen in the plan and undertaken in reality was "striking". The Turkish Cypriot perception is that the events of 1963-1964 were part of a policy of extermination. Turkish Cypriot nationalist narratives have presented the plan as a "blueprint for genocide", and it is widely perceived as a plan for extermination among Turkish Cypriots. The Turkish Ministry of Foreign Affairs calls the plan a "conspiracy to dissolve the Republic of Cyprus, in pre-determined stages and methods, and to bring about the union of Cyprus with Greece".

According to the scholar Niyazi Kızılyürek, however, the meaning later given to the plan was disproportionate, and the plan was a "stupid" and impractical plan that got more attention than it deserved because of propaganda. He claimed that in accordance to the plan, ELDYK troops should have taken action, which was not the case and led to Georgadjis shouting "traitors!" in front of their camp. Calling the plan "infamous", the scholar Evanthis Hatzivassiliou wrote that the aim of quick victory indicated the "confusion and wishful thinking of the Greek Cypriot side at that crucial moment".

See also
Cyprus
History of Cyprus
Modern history of Cyprus
Timeline of Cypriot history
Cyprus dispute
Turkish Cypriot enclaves
Kokkina exclave
Cypriot refugees
Cypriot intercommunal violence

References

Sources 

 
 
 
 
 
 
 

 
 
 
 
 
 
 

1963 in Cyprus
Cyprus dispute
1963 documents
Persecution of Turkish Cypriots